Živanice is a municipality and village in Pardubice District in the Pardubice Region of the Czech Republic. It has about 1,000 inhabitants.

Administrative parts
Villages of Dědek and Nerad are administrative parts of Živanice.

Sport
Živanice is home of a football club TJ Sokol Živanice, which plays in the Bohemian Football League (third tier of the Czech football system).

Gallery

References

External links

Villages in Pardubice District